Raisvand (also Romanized as Ra'īsvand) is a village in Tarhan-e Sharqi Rural District, Tarhan District, Kuhdasht County, Lorestan Province, Iran. At the 2006 census, its population was 548, in 104 families.

References 

Towns and villages in Kuhdasht County